Alan Belkin (born July 5, 1951) is a Canadian composer, organist, pianist as well as a pedagogue.

Early life 
Alan Belkin was born in Montreal. He began piano studies with Philip Cohen, then he studied organ with Dom André Laberge and with Bernard Lagacé. He studied composition with Marvin Duchow and in 1983, he got his doctorate from the Juilliard School in New York under the tutelage of American composers David Diamond and Elliott Carter.

Career

Since 1984, Belkin has taught theory and composition at University of Montreal.  He is acknowledged by Canadian Music Centre as an associate composer. He is now retired, and teaches online.

Alan Belkin maintains an English, French, German and Spanish web site which includes free texts on harmony, orchestration, counterpoint,  musical form and other musical subjects. Alan Belkin's works have been played in Canada, Mexico, Europe, and the United States.

Belkin's YouTube channel has more than 31,000 subscribers and contains both his music and much pedagogical material.

Works 

Symphony No. 1
Symphony No. 2
Symphony No. 3
Symphony No. 4
Symphony No. 5
Symphony No. 6 ("Phantoms")
Symphony No. 7
Symphony No. 8
Violin Concerto
Violin Concerto #2
Piano Concerto
Piano Concerto #2
Cello Concerto
Double Concerto for violin and cello
Sonata for piano solo
Sonata for viola and piano (2006)
Petite Suite, commissioned by the Duo Caron (versions for one piano and for two pianos)
Fantasies and Fugues for piano solo
Four Etudes for piano solo
Voices for guitar, commissioned by Peter McCutcheon
Adagio I (Electroacoustic)
Adagio II (Electroacoustic)
6 Songs for a Young Man
Four Emily Dickinson Songs
Do Not Go Gentle (choir, unaccompanied)
String Quartet No. 1
String Quartet No. 2
String Quartet No. 3
String Quartet No. 4
Adagio Symphonique pour Cordes
Elegy for String Orchestra
Symphonic Movement No. 2, for Strings
Trio, for violin, cello, and piano
12 Preludes and Fugues for piano
12 Preludes for piano
Nonet #2 (also exists in a version for piano and string quartet)
Symphonic Movement No. 3
Flute Sonata
Clarinet Sonata (with piano)
Piano Sonata #2
Clarinet Quartet
Ragtime, for orchestra
Music When Soft Voices Die, for choir
Concertino for Clarinet and Strings (Night Secrets)
Living with Daniel (melodrama for narrator and piano)
Cadenzas and Songs, for violin and piano

Discography 
Halogènes – excerpt of Night Labyrinth (1987): Adagio I (UMMUS UMM-101, 1990)

Honours 
Prix d'excellence en enseignement, catégorie professeur agrégé University of Montreal (1994)

Publications 
Musical Composition: Craft and Art, Yale University Press, 2018
Computer Music Journal
Journal of the Canadian University Music Society
Musicworks

Notes 
 http://www.musique.umontreal.ca/personnel/belkin_a.html

References 
Canadian Music Center – Alan Belkin
Practical Guide to Musical Composition
Journal of the Canadian University Music Society

External links 
Personal Website
Various - Halogènes (CD) at Discogs
YouTube channel

1951 births
Anglophone Quebec people
Canadian composers
Canadian male composers
Canadian music educators
Juilliard School alumni
Living people
Musicians from Montreal
Academic staff of the Université de Montréal